Petershagen is a town in the Minden-Lübbecke district, in North Rhine-Westphalia, Germany. It lies on the Westphalian Mill Route. The core is formed by the districts of Petershagen and Lahde, located opposite each other on the Weser.

Geography
Petershagen is situated on the river Weser, approx. 10 km north-east of Minden.

Neighbouring municipalities

Division of the town

The town of Petershagen consists of 29 districts:

International relations

Petershagen is twinned with:
  Petershagen-Eggersdorf (Brandenburg, Germany) -- since 1990

Notable people 
The following persons were born in Petershagen:

 Master Bertram (c. 1345 – c. 1415), painter (presumably born in Bierde)
 Johann Friedrich Wilhelm Herbst (1743–1807), natural scientist
 Johann Karl Ludwig Gieseler (1792–1854), Professor of Church History
 Henry Clay Brockmeyer (1826–1906), politician and translator of Hegel
 August Fick (1833–1916), Germanist and linguist
 Wilhelm Normann (1870–1939), inventor of fat hardening and thus the founder of margarine production
 Elsbeth Schragmüller (1887–1940), spy
 Edelgard Bulmahn (born 1951), politician
 Willi Brase (born 1951), politician

References

External links
 Official site 
 Virtual tour through the city Petershagen 

Minden-Lübbecke